Five Alive is a line of fruit juice blends created by Minute Maid, a subsidiary of The Coca-Cola Company. Both the name and the five colors of the logo refer to the five fruit juices each variety contains.

The juice line was first introduced in the late 1970s in both 12 oz. and 16 oz. cans. Marketing for Five Alive featured the slant rhyme catchphrase “get a taste for life”.

Starting in 1981, Five Alive was released in traditional juice box cartons alongside cans. By the 1990s, the beverages were no longer produced for the U.S. market. Five Alive continues limited production in Canada.

Varieties
 Citrus (orange, lemon, grapefruit, tangerine, and lime)
 Passionate Peach Citrus (peach, grape, orange, passion fruit, and lemon)
 Tropical Citrus (orange, apricot, guava, mango, and passion fruit)
Berry Citrus (apple, blackcurrant, grape, raspberry, and strawberry)
Mango Citrus (mango, kiwi, dragon fruit, granadilla, and banana)
 Pomegranate Citrus (grape, orange, pomegranate, tangerine, and lemon)
 Snow Crop (apple, grape, lemon, pineapple, and cherry)

Nutritional information 

Five Alive is not a significant source of saturated fat, trans fat, cholesterol, fiber, vitamin A, calcium, or iron.

The Nutrition Facts label on the Canadian 341 mL ready-to-serve can of Five Alive claims the beverage contains 140% of the recommended daily intake of vitamin C.  Five Alive contains 110 calories and 27 grams of sugar per 240 mL.

U.S. Five Alive labels list 41% fruit juice, with high fructose corn syrup as an ingredient after filtered water.

In the United Kingdom, quantitative ingredient labeling is mandatory; U.K. labels show that Five Alive contains 42% fruit juice, as well as 22% sugar and several artificial sweeteners.

References 

Coca-Cola brands
Juice brands